Johnathan Bailey Fields (born March 30, 1988) is a professional basketball player who plays for Tokyo Hachioji Bee Trains.

Honours
Oliveirense
 Portuguese League Cup: 2020

References

External links
 Tennessee Volunteers bio
 College stats at Sports-Reference.com

1988 births
Living people
American expatriate basketball people in Belgium
American expatriate basketball people in Canada
American expatriate basketball people in Finland
American expatriate basketball people in France
American expatriate basketball people in Germany
American expatriate basketball people in Greece
American expatriate basketball people in the Philippines
American expatriate basketball people in Portugal
American men's basketball players
Basketball players from Virginia
Belfius Mons-Hainaut players
Centers (basketball)
East Carolina Pirates men's basketball players
Fraser Valley Bandits players
Giessen 46ers players
Liège Basket players
Lille Métropole BC players
Magnolia Hotshots players
People from Woodbridge, Virginia
Sporting CP basketball players
Tennessee Volunteers basketball players
Terrafirma Dyip players
Tokyo Hachioji Bee Trains players
UNC Wilmington Seahawks men's basketball players
Philippine Basketball Association imports